The Rochdale Way is a circular  walking route around the Metropolitan Borough of Rochdale in Greater Manchester, which takes in the best scenery and interesting buildings of the area.

Areas covered include the following:
Hollingworth Lake
Blackstone Edge on the Pennine Way
Watergrove Reservoir
Healey Dell
Knowl Hill
Naden Valley
Queen's Park, Heywood
Rhodes
Alkrington
Middleton
Hopwood
Tandle Hill
Piethorne Valley

Bibliography
The Rochdale Way by Richard Catlow, John Cole and Martin Riley

Long-distance footpaths in England
Footpaths in Greater Manchester
Geography of the Metropolitan Borough of Rochdale